Firestone Tire and Rubber Store is a historic commercial building located in downtown Evansville, Indiana. It was built in 1930, and is a one-story, Art Deco style building.  The building was originally built to house a Firestone Tire and Rubber Company outlet.

It was listed on the National Register of Historic Places in 1984.

References

Commercial buildings on the National Register of Historic Places in Indiana
Art Deco architecture in Indiana
Commercial buildings completed in 1930
Buildings and structures in Evansville, Indiana
National Register of Historic Places in Evansville, Indiana